The Arizona Soccer Association (ASA), also known as the Arizona Youth Soccer Association (AYSA), is a nonprofit organization which was founded in 1974. The organization's goals are to promote the physical, mental and emotional growth and development of the youth of Arizona through soccer. The ASA/AYSA is a member of the United States Youth Soccer Association and the United States Soccer Federation.

Funding
The organization is partially supported by fund-raising events.

The ASA is also sponsored by numerous private entities including Adidas, Dick's Sporting Goods, Gatorade, Grand Canyon University, Jimmy John's, Marriott Hotels, Port of Subs, & Whataburger among others.

References

External links
 

1974 establishments in Arizona
Children's sport
Non-profit organizations based in Arizona
Organizations based in Phoenix, Arizona
Soccer governing bodies in the United States
Soccer in Arizona
Sports organizations established in 1974
State Soccer Associations
Youth soccer in the United States